The first season of Golpe de Sorte (Lucky Break) began airing on SIC 27 May 2019 and ended in 28 June 2019. The season one of the series stars Maria João Abreu, Dânia Neto and Jorge Corrula.

Plot 
Céu (Maria João Abreu) is a woman who sells fruit in a market and is surrounded by a maelstrom when she wins Euromilhões.

Bruno (Ângelo Rodrigues) is one of his sons with whom he shares that moment. But Heaven has a secret. When she was only 16, she became pregnant and gave birth to a boy. Since he could not create it, he gave it to a couple of emigrants who left for France.

Leonor (Diana Chaves) is the daughter of Fernando Alves Craveiro (Rogério Samora), the businessman who was deceived by Caio (Jorge Corrula) and Sílvia (Dânia Neto) who are two had met in an orphanage in the past and was killed in a car accident shortly after learning that he had the company in bankruptcy. Leonor wants to do justice by her own hands, and she also sets up a meticulous and well-designed plan to unmask them.

Cast

Main Cast

Recurrent Cast

Guest Cast

Guest Star Cast

Episodes

References 

Sociedade Independente de Comunicação original programming
2019 Portuguese television seasons